Thomas Nickerson (September 19, 1810 – July 24, 1892) was an American railroad executive. He served as the eighth president of the Atchison, Topeka and Santa Fe Railway (ATSF), between 1874 and 1880. He was also president of the Atlantic and Pacific Railroad.

Biography 
Nickerson was born in Brewster, Massachusetts, on September 19, 1810. His family was well known for the number of sailors it had produced, and Thomas himself also sailed for nearly 30 years before he turned to land transportation.

Nickerson invested in the ATSF around 1870, becoming the railroad's vice president in May 1873.  The next year, he was promoted to president of the ATSF, succeeding Henry Strong, where he served until 1880. Thomas Nickerson's brother Joseph also served as a railroad executive, and Joseph's son Albert W. Nickerson inherited several million dollars upon his father's death and was made a director of the ATSF and the Mexican Central Railway.

Nickerson didn't limit himself to just the ATSF.  He was also a prominent figure in the Atlantic and Pacific Railroad, Sonora Railway, California Southern Railroad and Mexican Central Railway, all subsidiary companies of the ATSF.

Nickerson died in Newton Center, Massachusetts, on July 24, 1892. His wife had died the year prior; he was survived by three children. The town of Nickerson, Kansas, founded in 1872, is named in his honor.

Sources 
  Nickerson, transcribed by Ward, Carolyn, July 2002.

References

1810 births
1892 deaths
People from Brewster, Massachusetts
Atchison, Topeka and Santa Fe Railway presidents
19th-century American railroad executives